Georg Gustaf Alexander Rosenqvist (13 September 1855, Lapinjärvi - 12 February 1931) was a Finnish Lutheran clergyman, theologian and politician. He was a member of the Diet of Finland from 1904 to 1906 and of the Parliament of Finland from 1907 to 1919, representing the Swedish People's Party of Finland (SFP). He was the elder brother of Vilhelm Rosenqvist.

References

1855 births
1931 deaths
People from Lapinjärvi
People from Uusimaa Province (Grand Duchy of Finland)
Swedish-speaking Finns
19th-century Finnish Lutheran clergy
Finnish Lutheran theologians
Swedish People's Party of Finland politicians
Members of the Diet of Finland
Members of the Parliament of Finland (1907–08)
Members of the Parliament of Finland (1908–09)
Members of the Parliament of Finland (1909–10)
Members of the Parliament of Finland (1910–11)
Members of the Parliament of Finland (1911–13)
Members of the Parliament of Finland (1913–16)
Members of the Parliament of Finland (1916–17)
Members of the Parliament of Finland (1917–19)
People of the Finnish Civil War (White side)
University of Helsinki alumni
Academic staff of the University of Helsinki
20th-century Finnish Lutheran clergy